Mary Scudamore ( Shelton; c. 1550 – 1603) was a courtier to Elizabeth I.

Career
She was a daughter of Sir John Shelton of Shelton Hall, Norfolk and his wife, Margaret Parker. She joined the household of Queen Elizabeth around the year 1567, serving as a chamberer.

Her family reached the zenith of their influence during the reign of Henry VIII, when Mary's grandparents, Sir John Shelton and Anne Shelton were entrusted with the custody of the future queens Mary I and Elizabeth I, in part because Anne Shelton was the aunt of Anne Boleyn. Also, Mary's aunt, poet Mary Shelton, was the King's mistress.

In 1571, Mary, as a chamberer, was given an allowance of clothing including satin for a gown, velvet to border and the gown, and sarcenet silk for its lining. She was to receive similar fabric every year. Some of her clothes were gifts from the queen, made by her tailor Walter Fyshe.

Mary Scudamore married another courtier, the  gentleman usher, Sir John Scudamore of Holme Lacy, Herefordshire. She married him secretly. and their marriage was revealed early in 1575. Elizabeth I was apparently extremely angry that this had been done without her consent, and allegedly attacked Mary, breaking her finger. A courtier wrote that Elizabeth was liberal both with blows and evil words.

In October 1574, Elizabeth I gave her, "Mistress Mary Skydmore", a gift of a forepart or skirt front.

References

Ladies of the Privy Chamber
Chamberers at court
1603 deaths
1550s births
16th-century English women
17th-century English women
17th-century English people
Mary
Mary
Court of Elizabeth I